Riduan bin Rubin is a Malaysian politician who was the Member of Parliament (MP) for Tenom from November 2022. He is a member of the Social Democratic Harmony Party (KDM)

Election results

Note

References 

Living people
21st-century Malaysian politicians
Members of the Dewan Rakyat
Members of the 15th Malaysian Parliament
Independent politicians in Malaysia
People from Sabah
Year of birth missing (living people)